Propalticidae  is a family of beetles, in the suborder Polyphaga. It contains two genera (Propalticus and Slipinskogenia) with the following species:

 Genus Propalticus Sharp, 1879
 Propalticus acupinctus John, 1939
 Propalticus africanus John, 1956
 Propalticus bryanti John, 1960
 Propalticus crassiceps John, 1960
 Propalticus cuneiformis John, 1960
 Propalticus decoomani John, 1960
 Propalticus discogenioides John, 1960
 Propalticus doddi John, 1960
 Propalticus dybasi John, 1960
 Propalticus indicus Sen Gupta, 1978
 Propalticus inflatus John, 1943
 Propalticus insularis John, 1960
 Propalticus jansoni Sharp, 1882
 Propalticus japonicus Nakane, 1966
 Propalticus kiuchii Sasaji, 1971
 Propalticus madagascariensis John, 1960
 Propalticus mixtocomatus John, 1939
 Propalticus morimotoi Kamiya, 1964
 Propalticus oculatus Sharp, 1879
 Propalticus ryukyuensis Kamiya, 1964
 Propalticus saipanensis John, 1960
 Propalticus santhomeae John, 1960
 Propalticus sarawakensis John, 1960
 Propalticus scriptitatus John, 1960
 Propalticus sechellarum Scott, 1922
 Propalticus sierraleonis John, 1960
 Propalticus simplex Crowson & Sen Gupta, 1969
 Propalticus striatus John, 1960
 Propalticus tonkinensis John, 1960
 Propalticus ulimanganus John, 1960
 Propalticus virgatus John, 1939
 Propalticus wainganus John, 1969
 Genus Slipinskogenia Gimmel, 2011
 Slipinskogenia bilineata John, 1942
 Slipinskogenia burgeoni John, 1942
 Slipinskogenia decemarticulata John, 1960
 Slipinskogenia disciformis Kolbe, 1897
 Slipinskogenia disposita John, 1940
 Slipinskogenia donisi John, 1956
 Slipinskogenia hargreavesi John, 1960
 Slipinskogenia latipenis John, 1942
 Slipinskogenia pulchripicta John, 1942
 Slipinskogenia schoutedeni John, 1942
 Slipinskogenia trilineata John, 1940

References

External links

 
Cucujoidea families